The suffix -phoresis means "migration":

Phoresis, where one organism attaches itself to another for travel.
 Diffusiophoresis, motion observed in liquid environments where chemical gradients are generated by contact between solutions with different solute concentrations
 Electrophoresis, motion of dispersed particles relative to a fluid under the influence of a spatially uniform electric field
 Isotachophoresis, technique in analytical chemistry used to separate charged particles
 Necrophoresis, disposal of bodies of dead members of their colony in social insects
 Thermophoresis, phenomenon observed when a mixture of two or more types of motile particles (particles able to move) is subjected to the force of a temperature gradient and the different types of particles respond to it differently

See also
Apheresis ('taking away'), where a constituent of blood is separated out and the remainder returned to the circulation

External links
 

Suffixes of Greek origin
Scientific suffixes
English suffixes